Pierpaolo is a masculine Italian given name. Notable people with the name include:

Pierpaolo Bisoli (born 1966), Italian football player and manager
Pierpaolo Cristofori (born 1956), Italian modern pentathlete
Pierpaolo De Negri (born 1986), Italian cyclist
Pierpaolo Ferrazzi (born 1965), Italian slalom canoeist
Pierpaolo Frattini (born 1984), Italian rower
Pierpaolo Monti, Italian musician
Pierpaolo Parisio (1473–1545), Italian cardinal
Pierpaolo Pedroni (1964–2009), Italian rugby player, referee and commentator
Pierpaolo Piccioli (born 1967), Italian fashion designer
Pierpaolo Spangaro (1942–2011), Italian swimmer

See also
 
 
 

Italian masculine given names
Saints Peter and Paul
Compound given names